Viktorija Novosel (born 18 March 1989) is a Croatian singer. She rose to fame as the winner of the second season of Supertalent.

Discography
 Kroz šumu (2011)

References

Living people
1989 births
Croatian pop singers
21st-century Croatian women singers
Musicians from Zagreb